Daynette 'Dee' Morikawa is an American politician and a Democratic member of the Hawaii House of Representatives since January 19, 2011 representing District 17.

Education
Morikawa earned her Associate degree in accounting from Kauaʻi Community College.

Elections
2012 Morikawa was unopposed for the August 11, 2012 Democratic Primary, winning with 3,403 votes, and won the November 6, 2012 General election with 6,049 votes (71.4%) against Republican nominee Troy Trujillo.
2010 Morikawa challenged incumbent Democratic Representative Roland Sagum in the District 16 (reapportioned to District 17 after the 2020 Census) September 18, 2010 Democratic Primary, winning with 2,657 votes (55.2%), and won the November 2, 2010 General election with 5,450 votes (73.3%) against Republican nominee Phil Sterker.

References

External links
Official page at the Hawaii State Legislature
 

Place of birth missing (living people)
Year of birth missing (living people)
Living people
Democratic Party members of the Hawaii House of Representatives
Kauaʻi Community College alumni
Women state legislators in Hawaii
21st-century American politicians
21st-century American women politicians